Gus Van Harten is a professor of Administrative Law at York University's Osgoode Hall. He is co-editor of the journal Administrative Law — Cases and Materials. He has particular focus on investor-state dispute settlement (ISDS).

Early years
He was born in Burlington, Canada, and was the oldest of 3 kids in his family. Van Harten clerked in the Ontario Court of Appeal and later worked on the Walkerton Inquiry over the two years from 2000, and then the Arar Inquiry for two years from 2004.

In academia
Van Harten was a faculty member in the Law Department of the London School of Economics, prior to his appointment at Osgoode Hall in 2008.

Van Harten is a critic of the Canada-China Foreign Investment Promotion and Protection Agreement.

Learned texts

References

Canadian legal scholars
Living people
Academic journal editors
Academics of the London School of Economics
Canadian expatriate academics in the United Kingdom
Academic staff of York University
Year of birth missing (living people)